Bolshoy Babinsky is a rural locality (a khutor) and the administrative center of Bolshebabinskoye Rural Settlement, Alexeyevsky District, Volgograd Oblast, Russia. The population was 297 as of 2010.

Geography 
Bolshoy Babinsky is located 12 km northeast of Alexeyevskaya (the district's administrative centre) by road. Kochkarinsky is the nearest rural locality.

References 

Rural localities in Alexeyevsky District, Volgograd Oblast